Platycotis vittata, the oak treehopper, is a species of treehopper in the family Membracidae, found in North America. The species is also called Platycotis vittatus.

References

External links

 

Membracinae
Insects described in 1803